Derek King (born 1967) is a Canadian former professional ice hockey player.

Derek King may also refer to:

 Derek King (Australian footballer) (born 1948), Australian rules football player
 Derek King (footballer, born 1929) (1929–2003), English football player
 Derek King (footballer, born 1980) (born 1980), Trinidad and Tobago international football player

See also
D'Eriq King (born 1997), American football player